List of museums in Rome
The city contains vast quantities of priceless art, sculpture and treasures, which are mainly stored in its many museums. A small selection in alphabetical order:

List 

 Ara Pacis
 Capitoline Museums
 Castel Sant'Angelo
 Circus of Maxentius (Villa di Massenzio)
 Centrale Montemartini
 Doria Pamphilj Gallery
 Enrico Fermi Center
 Galleria Borghese
 Palazzo Colonna
 Galleria Comunale d'Arte Moderna
 Galleria Nazionale d'Arte Antica
 Galleria Nazionale d'Arte Moderna
 Galleria Spada
 Gallery of the Academy of Saint Luke
 Geological Museum Rome
 Jewish Museum of Rome
 Keats-Shelley Memorial House
 Mausoleum of Augustus
 MAXXI (National Museum of the 21st century arts)
 Monument to Vittorio Emanuele II
 
 Museo Atelier Canova Tadolini
 Museo Barracco di Scultura Antica
 Museo Carlo Bilotti
 Museo Civico di Zoologia
 Museo dei Bambini
 Museo dei Fori Imperiali
 Museo del Corso
 Museo del Risorgimento
 Museo del Vicino Oriente
 Museo dell'Alto Medioevo
 Museo dell'Arte Classica
 Museo delle Anime del Purgatorio
 Museo Leonardo da Vinci
 Museo delle Mura
 Museo delle Origini
 Museo di Roma in Trastevere
 Museo di Roma
 Museo Napoleonico
 Museo nazionale del Palazzo di Venezia
 Museo Pietro Canonica
 Museum of Contemporary Art of Rome (MACRO)
 Museum of the Liberation of Rome
 Museum of Roman Civilization
 National Etruscan Museum
 National Museum of Oriental Art
 National Museum of Pasta Foods
 National Museum of Rome - A set of four museums in Rome displaying items discovered in Rome
 Baths of Diocletian
 Crypta Balbi
 Palazzo Altemps
 Palazzo Massimo alle Terme
 Pigorini National Museum of Prehistory and Ethnography
 Pontifical Museum of Christian Antiquities
 Porta San Paolo
 Torlonia Museum
 Trajan's Market
 Vatican Museums
 Venanzo Crocetti Museum
 Via Ostiense Museum
 Villa di Massenzio (Circus of Maxentius)
 Villa Farnesina

See also 
Vatican Museums
List of museums in Italy

References 

Rome
 
Rome
 
Museums